The Myanmar Army is the largest branch of the Armed Forces (Tatmadaw) of Myanmar (Burma) and has the primary responsibility of conducting land-based military operations. The Myanmar Army maintains the second largest active force in Southeast Asia after the People's Army of Vietnam, with a troop strength of around 350,000 in 2006. It has clashed against ethnic and political insurgents since its inception in 1948.

The force is headed by the Commander-in-Chief of Myanmar Army, currently Vice-Senior General Soe Win, concurrently Deputy Commander-in-Chief of the Defence Services, with Senior General Min Aung Hlaing as the Commander-in-Chief of Defence Services. The highest rank in the Myanmar Army is Senior General, equivalent to field marshal in Western armies and is currently held by Min Aung Hlaing after being promoted from Vice-Senior General.
 
In 2011, following a transition from military government to civilian parliamentary government, the Myanmar Army imposed a military draft on all citizens: all males from age 18 to 35 and all females from 18 to 27 years of age can be drafted into military service for two years as enlisted personnel in time of national emergency. The ages for professionals are up to 45 for men and 35 for women for three years service as commissioned and non-commissioned officers.
 
The Government Gazette reported that 1.8 trillion kyat (about US$2 billion), or 23.6 percent of the 2011 budget was for military expenditures.

Brief history

British and Japanese rule 
In the late 1930s, during the period of British rule, a few Myanmar organizations or parties formed an alliance named Burma's Htwet-Yet (Liberation) Group, one of them being Dobama Asiayone. Since most of the members were Communist, they wanted help from Chinese Communists; but when Tha-khin Aung San and a partner secretly went to China for help, they only met with a Japanese general and made an alliance with Japanese Army. In the early 1940s, Aung San and other 29 participants secretly went for the military training under Japanese Army and these 30 people are later known as the "30 Soldiers" in Myanmar history and can be regarded as the origin of the modern Myanmar Army.

When the Japanese invasion of Burma was ready, the 30 Soldiers recruited Myanmar people in Thailand and founded Burmese Independence Army (BIA), which was the first phase of Myanmar Army. In 1942, BIA assisted Japanese Army in their conquest of Burma, which succeeded. After that, Japanese Army changed BIA to Burmese Defense Army (BDA), which was the second phase. In 1943, Japan officially declared Burma an independent nation, but the new Burmese government did not possess de facto rule over the country.

While assisting the British Army in 1945, the Myanmar Army entered into its third phase, as the Patriotic Burmese Force (PBF), and the country became under British rule again. Afterwards, the structure of the army fell under British authority; hence, for those who were willing to serve the nation but not in that army, General Aung San organized the People's Comrades force.

Post-Independence era 

 
At the time of Myanmar's independence in 1948, the Tatmadaw was weak, small and disunited. Cracks appeared along the lines of ethnic background, political affiliation, organisational origin and different services. Its unity and operational efficiency was further weakened by the interference of civilians and politicians in military affairs, and the perception gap between the staff officers and field commanders. The most serious problem was the tension between ethnic Karen Officers, coming from the British Burma Army and Bamar officers, coming from the Patriotic Burmese Forces (PBF).
 
In accordance with the agreement reached at Kandy Conference in September 1945, the Tatmadaw was reorganised by incorporating the British Burma Army and the Patriotic Burmese Forces. The officer corps shared by ex-PBF officers and officers from British Burma Army and Army of Burma Reserve Organisation (ARBO). The colonial government also decided to form what were known as "Class Battalions" based on ethnicity. There were a total of 15 rifle battalions at the time of independence and four of them were made up of former members of PBF. All influential positions within the War Office and commands were manned with non-former PBF Officers. All services including military engineers, supply and transport, ordnance and medical services, Navy and Air Force were all commanded by former officers from ABRO and British Burma Army.

Formation and structure

The army has always been by far the largest service in Myanmar and has always received the lion's share of the defence budget. It has played the most prominent part in Myanmar's struggle against the 40 or more insurgent groups since 1948 and acquired a reputation as a tough and resourceful military force. In 1981, it was described as 'probably the best army in Southeast Asia, apart from Vietnam's'. The judgement was echoed in 1983, when another observer noted that "Myanmar's infantry is generally rated as one of the toughest, most combat seasoned in Southeast Asia".
In 1985, a foreign journalist with the rare experience of seeing Burmese soldiers in action against ethnic insurgents and narco-armies was "thoroughly impressed by their fighting skills, endurance and discipline". Other observers during that period characterised the Myanmar Army as "the toughest, most effective light infantry jungle force now operating in Southeast Asia". Even the Thai people, not known to praise the Burmese lightly, have described the Myanmar Army as "skilled in the art of jungle warfare".

Organisation
The Myanmar Army had reached some 370,000 active troops of all ranks in 2000. There were 337 infantry battalions, including 266 light infantry battalions as of 2000. This is composed of a headquarters unit; five rifle companies  with three rifle platoons  each; an administrative company with medical, transport, logistics, and signals units; a heavy weapons company including mortar, machine gun, and recoilless gun platoons. Each battalion is commanded by a lieutenant colonel  with a major as second in command, with a total strength of 27 officers and 723 other ranks. Light infantry battalions in the Myanmar Army have much lower establishment strength of around 500; this often leads to these units being mistakenly identified by observers as under-strength infantry battalions.
 
With its significantly increased personnel numbers, weaponry, and mobility, today's  is a formidable conventional defence force for the Union of Myanmar. Troops ready for combat duty have at least doubled since 1988. Logistics infrastructure and artillery fire support have been greatly increased. Its newly acquired military might was apparent in the Tatmadaw's dry season operations against Karen National Union (KNU) strongholds in Manerplaw and Kawmura. Most of the casualties at these battles were the result of intense and heavy bombardment by the Tatmadaw Kyee. The Tatmadaw Kyee is now much larger than it was before 1988, it is more mobile and has greatly improved armour, artillery, and air defence inventories. Its C3I (Command, Control, Communications, Computers and Intelligence) systems have been expanded and refined. It is developing larger and more integrated, self-sustained formations to improve coordinated action by different combat arms. The army may still have relatively modest weaponry compared to its larger neighbours, but it is now in a much better position to deter external aggression and respond to such a threat should it ever arise, although child soldiers may not perform very well in combating with enemies.

Expansion
The first army division to be formed after the 1988 military coup was the 11th Light Infantry Division (LID) in December 1988 with Colonel Win Myint as commander. In March 1990, a new regional military command was created in Monywa with Brigadier Kyaw Min as commander and named the North-Western Regional Military Command. A year later, 101st LID was formed in Pakokku with Colonel Saw Tun as commander. Two Regional Operations Commands (ROC) were formed in Myeik and Loikaw to improve command and control. They were commanded respectively by Brigadier Soe Tint and Brigadier Maung Kyi. March 1995 saw a dramatic expansion of the Tatmadaw as it established 11 Military Operations Commands (MOC)s in that month. MOC are similar to mechanised infantry divisions in Western armies, each with 10 regular infantry battalions, a headquarters, and organic support units including field artillery. In 1996, two new RMC were opened, Coastal Region RMC was opened in Myeik with Brigadier Sit Maung as commander and Triangle Region RMC in Kengtung with Brigadier Thein Sein as commander. Three new ROCs were created in Kalay, Bhamo and Mongsat. In late 1998, two new MOCs were created in Bokepyin and Mongsat.
 
The most significant expansion after the infantry in the army was in armour and artillery. Beginning in 1990, the Tatmadaw procured 18 T-69II main battle tanks and 48 T-63 amphibious light tanks from China. Further procurements were made, including several hundred Type 85 and Type 92 armoured personnel carriers (APC). By the beginning of 1998, Tatmadaw had about 100 T-69II main battle tanks, a similar number of T-63 amphibious light tanks, and several T-59D tanks. These tanks and armoured personnel carriers were distributed throughout five armoured infantry battalions and five tank battalions and formed the first armoured division of the Tatmadaw as the 71st Armoured Operations Command with its headquarters in Pyawbwe.

Bureau of Special Operations (BSO)

The Bureau of Special Operations in the Myanmar Army are high-level field units equivalent to field armies in Western terms and consist of two or more regional military commands (RMC) commanded by a lieutenant general and six staff officers.
 
The units were introduced under the General Staff Office on 28 April 1978 and 1 June 1979. In early 1978, the Chairman of BSPP, General Ne Win, visited the Northeastern Command Headquarters in Lashio to receive a briefing about Burmese Communist Party (BCP) insurgents and their military operations. He was accompanied by Brigadier General Tun Ye from the Ministry of Defence. Brigadier General Tun Ye was the regional commander of the Eastern Command for three years and before that he served in Northeastern Command areas as commander of Strategic Operation Command (SOC) and commander of Light Infantry Divisions for four years. As BCP military operations were spread across three Regional Military Command (RMC) areas (Northern, Eastern, and Northeastern), Brigadier General Tun Ye was the most informed commander about the BCP in the Myanmar Army at the time. At the briefing, General Ne Win was impressed by Brigadier General Tun Ye and realised that co-ordination among various Regional Military Commands (RMC) was necessary; thus, decided to form a bureau at the Ministry of Defence.
 
Originally, the bureau was for "special operations", wherever they were, that needed co-ordination among various Regional Military Commands (RMC). Later, with the introduction of another bureau, there was a division of command areas. The BSO-1 was to oversee the operations under the Northern Command, Northeastern Command, the Eastern Command, and the Northwestern Command. BSO-2 was to oversee operations under the Southeastern Command, Southwestern Command, Western Command and Central Command.
 
Initially, the chief of the BSO had the rank of brigadier general. The rank was upgraded to major general on 23 April 1979. In 1990, it was further upgraded to lieutenant general. Between 1995 and 2002, Chief of Staff (Army) jointly held the position of Chief of BSO. However, in early 2002, two more BSO were added to the General Staff Office; therefore there were altogether four BSOs. The fifth BSO was established in 2005 and the sixth in 2007.
 
Currently there are six Bureaus of Special Operations in the Myanmar order of battle.

Regional Military Commands (RMC)
For better command and communication, the Tatmadaw formed a Regional Military Commands structure in 1958. Until 1961, there were only two regional commands, they were supported by 13 infantry brigades and an infantry division. In October 1961, new regional military commands were opened and leaving only two independent infantry brigades. In June 1963, the Naypyidaw Command was temporarily formed in Yangon with the deputy commander and some staff officers drawn from Central Command. It was reorganised and renamed as Yangon Command on 1 June 1965.
 
A total of 337 infantry and light infantry battalions organised in Tactical Operations Commands, 37 independent field artillery regiments supported by affiliated support units including armoured reconnaissance and tank battalions. RMCs are similar to corps formations in Western armies. The RMCs, commanded by major general, are managed through a framework of Bureau of Special Operations (BSOs), which are equivalent to field army group in Western terms.

Commanders of Regional Military Commands

Regional Operations Commands (ROC)
Regional Operations Commands (ROC) are commanded by a brigadier general, are similar to infantry brigades in Western Armies. Each consists of 4 Infantry battalions (Chay Hlyin Tatyin), HQ and organic support units.  Commander of ROC is a position between LID/MOC commander and tactical Operation Command (TOC) commander, who commands three infantry battalions. The ROC commander holds financial, administrative and judicial authority while the MOC and LID commanders do not have judicial authority.

Military Operations Commands (MOC)

Military Operations Commands (MOC), commanded by a brigadier-general are similar to Infantry Divisions in Western Armies. Each consists of 10 Mechanised Infantry battalions equipped with BTR-3 armoured personnel carriers, Headquarters and support units including field artillery batteries. These ten battalions are organised into three Tactical Operations Commands: one Mechanised Tactical Operations Command with BTR-3 armoured personnel carriers, and two Motorized Tactical Operations Command with EQ-2102 6x6 trucks.
 
MOC are equivalent to Light Infantry Divisions (LID) in the Myanmar Army order of battle as both command 10 infantry battalions through three TOC's (Tactical Operations Commands). However, unlike Light Infantry Divisions, MOC are subordinate to their respective Regional Military Command (RMC) Headquarters. Members of MOC does not wear distinguished arm insignias and instead uses their respective RMC's arm insignias. For example, MOC-20 in Kawthaung wore the arm insignia of Coastal Region Military Command.

Light Infantry Divisions (LID)
Light Infantry Division ( or ), commanded by a brigadier general, each with 10 Light Infantry Battalions organised under 3 Tactical Operations Commands, commanded by a Colonel (3 battalions each and 1 reserve), 1 Field Artillery Battalion, 1 Armour Squadron and other support units.
 
These divisions were first introduced to the Myanmar Army in 1966 as rapid reaction mobile forces for strike operations. 77th Light Infantry Division was formed on 6 June 1966, followed by 88th Light Infantry Division and 99th Light Infantry Division in the two following years. 77th LID was largely responsible for the defeat of the Communist forces of the CPB (Communist Party of Burma) based in the forested hills of the central Bago Mountains in the mid-1970s. Three more LIDs were raised in the latter half of the 1970s (the 66th, 55th and 44th) with their headquarters at Pyay, Aungban and Thaton. They were followed by another two LIDs in the period prior to the 1988 military coup (the 33rd LID with headquarters at Sagaing and the 22nd LID with headquarters at Hpa-An). 11th LID was formed in December 1988 with headquarters at Inndine, Bago Division and 101st LID was formed in 1991 with its headquarters at Pakokku.
 
Each LID, commanded by Brigadier General level officers, consists of 10 light infantry battalions specially trained in counter-insurgency, jungle warfare, "search and destroy" operations against ethnic insurgents and narcotics-based armies. These battalions are organised under three Tactical Operations Commands (TOC). Each TOC, commanded by a Colonel, is made up of three or more combat battalions, with command and support elements similar to that of brigades in Western armies. One infantry battalion is held in reserve. As of 2000, all LIDs have their own organic Field Artillery units. For example, 314th Field Artillery Battery is now attached to 44th LID. Some of the LID battalions have been given Parachute and Air Borne Operations training and two of the LIDs have been converted to mechanised infantry formation with divisional artillery, armoured reconnaissance and tank battalions
 
LIDs are considered to be a strategic asset of the Myanmar Army, and after the 1990 reorganisation and restructuring of the Tatmadaw command structure, they are now directly answerable to Chief of Staff (Army).

Missile, Artillery and armoured units

Missile, Artillery and armoured units were not used in an independent role, but were deployed in support of the infantry by the Ministry of Defence as required. The Directorate of Artillery and Armour Corps was also divided into separate corps in 2001. The Directorate of Artillery and Missile Corps was also divided into separate corps in 2009. A dramatic expansion of forces under these directorates followed with the equipment procured from China, Russia, Ukraine and India.

Directorate of Missiles

No(1) Missile Operational Command MOC(1)
 HQ battalion
 10 Missile Battalions:

Directorate of Artillery 

No. 1 Artillery Battalion was formed in 1952 with three artillery batteries under the Directorate of Artillery Corps. A further three artillery battalions were formed in the late 1952. This formation remained unchanged until 1988. Since 2000, the Directorate of Artillery Corps has overseen the expansion of Artillery Operations Commands(AOC) from two to 10. Tatmadaw's stated intention is to establish an organic Artillery Operations Command in each of the 12 Regional Military Command Headquarters. Each Artillery Operation Command is composed of the following:
 
As of 2000, the Artillery wing of the Tatmadaw has about 60 battalions and 37 independent Artillery companies/batteries attached to various Regional Military Commands (RMC), Light Infantry Divisions (LID), Military Operation Command (MOC) and Regional Operation Command (ROC). For example, 314th Artillery Battery is under 44th LID, 326 Artillery Battery is attached to 5th MOC, 074 Artillery Battery is under the command of ROC (Bhamo) and 076 Artillery Battery is under North-Eastern RMC. Twenty of these Artillery battalions are grouped under 707th Artillery Operation Command (AOC) headquarters in Kyaukpadaung and 808th Artillery Operation Command (AOC) headquarters in Oaktwin, near Taungoo. The remaining 30 battalions, including 7 Anti-Aircraft artillery battalions are under the Directorate of Artillery Corps.

Artillery Operations Command (AOC) 
 HQ battalion
 12 Artillery battalions:
 6 Light Field artillery battalion equipped with 105 mm, 76 mm, 75 mm howitzers, field guns and mountain guns,
 3 Medium Field Artillery battalion equipped with 155 mm, 130 mm, 122 mm howitzers and field guns,
 1 Multiple Rocket Launcher battalion equipped with 122 mm and 240 mm MLRS, self-propelled and towed launchers,
 1 Air Defence Artillery battalion with 37 mm, 57 mm Anti-Aircraft guns or SA 18 IGLAs) man portable surface-to-air missiles and
 1 target acquisition battalion.
 support units

Light field artillery battalions consists of 3 field artillery batteries with 36 field guns or howitzers (12 guns per battery). Medium artillery battalions consists of 3 medium artillery batteries of 18 field guns or howitzers (6 guns per one battery). As of 2011, all field guns of Myanmar Artillery Corps are undergoing upgrade programs including GPS Fire Control Systems.

Directorate of Armour

No. 1 Armour Company and No. 2 Armour Company were formed in July 1950 under the Directorate of Armour and Artillery Corps with Sherman tanks, Stuart light tanks, Humber Scout Cars, Ferret armoured cars and Universal Bren Carriers. These two companies were merged on 1 November 1950 to become No. 1 Armour Battalion with headquarters in Mingalardon. On 15 May 1952 No. Tank Battalion was formed with 25 Comet tanks acquired from the United Kingdom. The Armour Corps within Myanmar Army was the most neglected one for nearly thirty years since the Tatmadaw had not procured any new tanks or armoured carriers since 1961.
 
Armoured divisions, known as Armoured Operations Command (AROC), under the command of Directorate of Armour Corps, were also expanded in number from one to two, each with four Armoured Combat battalions equipped with Infantry fighting vehicles and armoured personnel carriers, three tank battalions equipped with main battle tanks and three Tank battalions equipped with light tanks.
 In mid-2003, Tamadaw acquired 139+ T-72 main battle tanks from Ukraine and signed a contract to build and equip a factory in Myanmar to produce and assemble 1,000 BTR armoured personnel carriers in 2004. In 2006, the Government of India transferred an unspecified number of T-55 main battle tanks that were being phased out from active service to Tatmadaw along with 105 mm light field guns, armoured personnel carriers and indigenous HAL Light Combat Helicopters in return for Tatmadaw's support and co-operation in flushing out Indian insurgent groups operating from its soil.

Armoured Operations Command (AROC)

Armoured Operations Commands (AROC) are equivalent to Independent armoured divisions in western terms. Currently there are 5 Armoured Operations Commands under Directorate of Armoured Corps in the Tatmadaw order of battle. Tatmadaw planned to establish an AROC each in 7 Regional Military Commands. Typical armoured divisions in the Myanmar Army are composed of Headquarters, Three Armored Tactical Operations Command – each with one mechanised infantry battalion equipped with 44 BMP-1 or MAV-1 Infantry Fighting Vehicles, Two Tank Battalions equipped with 44 main battle tanks each, one armoured reconnaissance battalion equipped with 32 Type-63A Amphibious Light Tanks, one field artillery battalion and a support battalion. The support battalion is composed of an engineer squadron, two logistic squadrons, and a signal company.
 
The Myanmar Army acquired about 150 refurbished EE-9 Cascavel armoured cars from an Israeli firm in 2005. Classified in the army's service as a light tank, the Cascavel is currently deployed in the eastern Shan State and triangle regions near the Thai border.

Office of the Chief of Air Defence 

The Office of the chief of Air Defence is one of the major branches of Tatmadaw. It was established as the Air Defence Command in 1997, but was not fully operational until late 1999. It was renamed the Bureau of Air Defence in the early 2000s. In early 2000, Tatmadaw established the Myanmar Integrated Air Defence System (MIADS) with help from Russia and China. It is a tri-service bureau with units from all three branches of the armed forces. All air defence assets except anti-aircraft artillery are integrated into MIADS.

Directorate of Signal 

Soon after the independence in 1948, Myanmar Signal Corps was formed with units from Burma Signals, also known as "X" Branch. It consisted HQ Burma Signals, Burma Signal Training Squadron (BSTS) and Burma Signals Squadron. HQ Burma Signals was located within War Office. BSTS based in Pyain Oo Lwin was formed with Operating Cipher Training Troop, Dispacth Rider Training Troop, Lineman Training Troop, Radio Mechanic Training Troop and Regimental Signals Training Troop. BSS, based in Mingalardon, had nine sections: Administration Troop, Maintenance Troop, Operating Troop, Cipher Troop, Lineman and Dispatch Rider Troop, NBSD Signals Troop, SBSD Signals Troop, Mobile Brigade Signals Toop and Arakan Signals Toop. The then Chief of Signal Staff Officer (CSO) was Lieutenant Colonel Saw Aung Din. BSTS and BSS were later renamed No. 1 Signal Battalion and No.1 Signal Training Battalion. In 1952, the Infantry Divisional Signals Regiment was formed and later renamed to No. 2 Signal Battalion. HQ Burma Signals was reorganised and became Directorate Signal and the director was elevated to the rank of Colonel. In 1956, No. 1 Signal Security Battalion was formed, followed by No. 3 Signal Battalion in November 1958 and No.4 Signal Battalion in October 1959.
 
In 1961, signal battalions were reorganised as No. 11 Signal Battalion under Northeastern Regional Military Command, No. 121 Signal Battalion under Eastern Command, No. 313 Signal Battalion under Central Command, No.414 Signal Battalion under Southwestern Command, and No. 515 Signal Battalion under Southeastern Command. No.1 Signal Training Battalion was renamed Burma Signal Training Depot (Baho-Setthweye-Tat).
 
By 1988, Directorate of Signals command one training depot, eight signal battalions, one signal security battalion, one signal store depot and two signal workshops. Signal Corps under Directorate of Signal further expanded during 1990 expansion and reorganisation of Myanmar Armed Forces. By 2000, a signal battalion is attached to each Regional Military Command and signal companies are now attached to Light Infantry Divisions and Military Operations Commands.
 
In 2000, Command, Control and Communication system of Myanmar Army has been substantially upgraded by setting up the military fibre optic communication network managed by Directorate of Signal throughout the country. Since 2002 all Myanmar Army Regional Military Command HQs used its own telecommunication system. Satellite communication links are also provided to forward-deployed infantry battalions. However, battle field communication systems are still poor. Infantry units are still using TRA 906 and PRM 4051 which were acquired from UK in the 1980s. Myanmar Army also uses the locally built TRA 906 Thura and Chinese XD-D6M radio sets. Frequency hopping handsets are fitted to all front line units.
 
Between 2000 and 2005, Myanmar army bought 50 units of Brett 2050 Advanced Tech radio set from Australia through third party from Singapore. Those units are distributed to ROCs in central & upper regions to use in counterinsurgency operations.

Directorate of Medical Services

At the time of independence in 1948, the medical corps has two Base Military Hospitals, each with 300 beds, in Mingalardon and Pyin Oo Lwin, a Medical Store Depot in Yangon, a Dental Unit and six Camp Reception Stations located in Myitkyina, Sittwe, Taungoo, Pyinmana, Bago and Meikhtila. Between 1958 and 1962, the medical corps was restructured and all Camp Reception Stations were reorganised into Medical Battalions.
 
In 1989, Directorate of Medical Services has significantly expanded along with the infantry. In 2007, there are two 1,000-bed Defence Services General Hospitals (Mingalardon and Naypyitaw), two 700-bed hospitals in Pyin Oo Lwin and Aung Ban, two 500-bed military hospitals in Meikhtila and Yangon, one 500-bed Defence Services Orthopedic Hospital in Mingalardon, two 300-bed Defence Services Obstetric, Gynecological and Children hospitals (Mingalardon and Naypyitaw), three 300-bed Military Hospitals (Myitkyina, Ann and Kengtung), eighteen 100-bed Military Hospitals (Mongphyet, Baan, Indaing, Bahtoo, Myeik, Pyay, Loikaw, Namsam, Lashio, Kalay, Mongsat, Dawai, Kawthaung, Laukai, Thandaung, Magway, Sittwe, and Hommalin), fourteen field medical battalions, which are attached to various Regional Military Commands throughout the country. Each Field Medical Battalion consist of 3 Field Medical Companies with 3 Field Hospital Units and a specialist team each. Health & Disease Control Unit (HDCU) is responsible for prevention, control & eradication of diseases.

Training

Defence academies and colleges

Training schools

Ranks and insignia

Commissioned officer ranks
The rank insignia of commissioned officers.

Other ranks
The rank insignia of non-commissioned officers and enlisted personnel.

Order of battle
 14 × Regional Military Commands (RMC) organised in 6 Bureau of Special Operations (BSO)
 6 × Regional Operations Commands (ROC)
 20 × Military Operations Commands (MOC) including 1 × Airborne Infantry Division
 10 × Light Infantry Divisions (LID)
 5 × Armoured Operation Commands (AOC) (Each with 6 Tank Battalions and 4 Armoured Infantry Battalions (IFVs/APCs).)
 10 × Artillery Operation Commands (AOC) (with of 113 Field Artillery Battalions)
 9 × Air Defence Operation Commands 
 1 × Missile Operation Commands
 40+ × Military Affair Security Companies (MAS Units replaces former Military Intelligence Units after the disbandment of the Directorate of Defence Service Intelligence (DDSI))
 45 × Advanced Signal Battalions
 54 × Field Engineer Battalions
 4 × Armoured Engineer Battalions
 14 × Medical Battalions

Equipment

Gallery

See also

 Ne Win
 Tatmadaw
 Myanmar Navy
 Myanmar Air Force
 Military Intelligence of Myanmar
 Myanmar Police Force

Note

References

 http://www.strategypage.com/htmw/htada/articles/20081229.aspx?comments=Y
 http://www.enotes.com/topic/Myanmar_Armed_Forces

Further reading
 Samuel Blythe, 'Army conditions leave Myanmar under strength,' Jane's Defence Weekly, Vol. 43, Issue 14, 5 April 2006, 12.

External links
 Role of officers in Burmese Army (Part 1)  Bo Htet Min, Mizzima, 23 January 2010
 

Military of Myanmar
Armies by country
1945 establishments in Burma
Military units and formations established in 1945